Pedro Pérez Delgado (1881, Ospino, Estado Portuguesa, Venezuela - 7 November 1924, Puerto Cabello, Venezuela), better known as "Maisanta", was a nineteenth-century Venezuelan revolutionary and politician.

Maisanta was the great-great grandfather of late-20th- and early-21st-century president of Venezuela, Hugo Chávez (1954–2013), and so Chávez held a great deal of reverence for him.

References

 

1881 births
1924 deaths
People from Portuguesa (state)
Venezuelan rebels
Venezuelan revolutionaries
Hugo Chávez